Rogers Pass is a mountain pass that rises  above sea level and is located on the Continental Divide in the U.S. state of Montana. The pass is adjacent to Helena National Forest and is traversed by Montana Highway 200, providing the shortest route between the cities of Great Falls and Missoula, Montana.

The region between the two passes is mostly wilderness, and the majority of it has been set aside and protected from future development. The Great Bear, Scapegoat and Bob Marshall Wildernesses have been consolidated into the Bob Marshall Wilderness Complex and permanently protect . The region is noted for its inaccessibility and as one of the last strongholds for the grizzly bear in the lower 48 states. The Scapegoat Wilderness is a  hike north of Rogers Pass via the Continental Divide Trail.

Origin of name
Rogers Pass in Montana was named by the Great Northern Railway for one of the line's locating surveyors, A.B. Rogers, who located the pass in 1887. In 1881 and 1882, A.B. Rogers was a surveyor for the Canadian Pacific Railway (CPR), and he located Rogers Pass in British Columbia, which was then used by the CPR on its transcontinental line across Canada. The CPR named the pass after Rogers. James J. Hill, who controlled the Great Northern, then hired Rogers as a locating engineer on the latter, which built into Montana in 1887. Shortly after Rogers had located the pass in Montana that bears his name, his career ended when he was badly injured falling from his horse. Although Hill and the Great Northern eventually chose Marias Pass,  to the north, as the route over the Continental Divide for their transcontinental railroad, Hill saw to it that Rogers Pass in Montana was named after the surveyor.

Golden eagle migration route
The region is a noted location for observation of golden eagles and, to a lesser extent, bald eagles. In March and April, strong westerly winds help migrating flocks of eagles cross the Continental Divide so that they can spend the summer on the Great Plains. During these months, over 800 golden eagles and 129 bald eagles have been observed heading east. From mid-September through October, a similar migration occurs, but in the opposite direction. This is also a migration route used by other raptors such as northern goshawks, red-tailed hawks, and rough-legged hawks. Canada geese, tundra swans, and snow geese also use the pass during migration periods.

Climate
According to the Köppen climate classification system, Rogers Pass has a humid continental climate, abbreviated "Dfb" on climate maps. Summers tend to be warm to hot, with cooler nighttime temperatures, while winters are very snowy and cold, sometimes severely cold. Precipitation peaks during late spring and early summer.

Record-cold temperature
Rogers Pass is the location of the lowest temperature ever recorded in the contiguous United States. Only Alaska, Antarctica, Canada, Greenland, China and Russia have recorded lower temperatures. Since the establishment of the modern weather station in 1964, however, the temperature has not fallen below .

See also
 List of mountain passes in Montana
 List of weather records
A.B. Rogers
Lewis and Clark Pass (Montana)
Rogers Pass (British Columbia)

Cited references

Landforms of Lewis and Clark County, Montana
Mountain passes of Montana